Karan Grover (born 22 June 1982) is an Indian actor who primarily works in Hindi television. He made his acting debut in 2004 with Saarrthi portraying Arjun Goenka. Grover is best known for his portrayal of Karan Prasad in Yahan Main Ghar Ghar Kheli, Shantanu Kant in Bahu Hamari Rajni Kant, heart surgeon Dr. Rohit Sippy in Kahaan Hum Kahaan Tum and Angad Maan in Udaariyaan.

Grover made his film debut in 2015 with Wedding Pullav. Since July 2022, he is portraying Ritesh Malhotra in Bohot Pyaar Karte Hai

Early life
Grover was born on 22 June 1982. He studied chemical engineering from Institute of Technology, Mumbai and an event management course from National Institute of Event Management.

Grover worked as an event manager for a year before receiving an offer to appear on Gladrags.

Career
Grover worked with Omung Kumar's event management company for a year before participating in the Gladrags contest in 2004. He was amongst the five finalists.

He made his television debut in 2004 as Arjun Goenka in Saarrthi. After which he appeared in several shows, including Meri Awaz Ko Mil Gayi Roshni, Woh Rehne Waali Mehlon Ki, Yahaaan Main Ghar Ghar Kheli, Hum Aapke Hain In Laws, Teri Meri Love Stories and Lakhon Mein Ek and Punar Vivah. In 2007, he participated in Star Plus's Nach Baliye 3 with Kavita Kaushik.

In 2015, Grover made his film debut with Wedding Pullav where he played J. In 2016, he played Shantanu Kant in Bahu Hamari Rajni Kant opposite Ridhima Pandit. He also appeared in Vikram Bhatt's web series Spotlight 2 which aired on Viu.

From 2019 to 2020, Grover portrayed Dr. Rohit Sippy in Star Plus's Kahaan Hum Kahaan Tum opposite Dipika Kakar. From 2021 to 2022, he playing the role of Angad Maan in Colors TV's popular show Udaariyaan. Since July 2022, he portrayed Ritesh Malhotra in Star Bharat's Bohot Pyaar Karte Hai.

Personal life
Grover married actress Poppy Jabbal in a ceremony held in Himachal Pradesh on 31 May 2022.

Media image
Grover ranked 20th in Times of India's Most Desirable Men on TV list of 2019.

Filmography

Films

Television

Special appearances

Web series

Awards and nominations

See also
 List of Indian television actors

References

External links

 
 

1982 births
Living people
Indian male television actors
Male actors from Mumbai
Indian male film actors
21st-century Indian male actors
Male actors in Hindi cinema
Participants in Indian reality television series